In Shinto shrine architecture, a  is the part within a Shinto shrine's compound used to house offerings. It normally consists of a connecting section linking the honden (sanctuary, closed to the public) to the haiden (oratory). If the shrine is built in the Ishi-no-ma-zukuri style, its stone pavement is lower than the floor of the other two rooms, and it is called , hence the name. It can also be called  or in other ways, and its position can sometimes vary. In spite of its name, nowadays it is used mostly for rituals.

References

Shinto